This article lists the full results for knockout stage of 2020 European Women's Team Badminton Championships. All times are Central European Time (UTC+01:00).

Quarterfinals

Denmark vs. Turkey

France vs. Sweden

Hungary vs. Germany

Scotland vs. Russia

Semifinals

Denmark vs. France

Germany vs. Scotland

Final

Denmark vs. Germany

References

2020 European Men's and Women's Team Badminton Championships